Muni Village is located in Oluko Subcounty within Uganda's Arua District. It is found south of Arua Municipality and Barifa Forest through which a road connecting it to the main town passes. Visible from the top of Arua Hill, the village can also be reached from Ewuata on the Nebbi Highway. Notable places of interest in Muni include the National Teachers' College (which will be incorporated into Muni University), several other establishments including TPO (Transcultural Psychosocial Organisation) and Muni Girls School.

Arua District